Drasteria mongoliensis is a moth of the family Erebidae found mostly in Russia (Siberia) and Mongolia.

References

Drasteria
Moths described in 1969
Moths of Asia